The Permanent Representative of the United Kingdom to the United Nations is the United Kingdom's foremost diplomatic representative to the United Nations, and in charge of the United Kingdom Mission to the United Nations (UKMIS). UK permanent representatives to the UN hold the personal rank of ambassador. The full official title and style is His Britannic Majesty's Permanent Representative from the United Kingdom of Great Britain and Northern Ireland to the United Nations.

Permanent representatives to the United Nations

 1946–1950: Sir Alexander Cadogan
 1950–1954: Sir Gladwyn Jebb
 1954–1960: Sir Pierson Dixon
 1960–1964: Sir Patrick Dean
 1964–1970: Lord Caradon
 1970–1973: Sir Colin Crowe
 1973–1974: Sir Donald Maitland
 1974–1979: Lord Richard
 1979–1982: Sir Anthony Parsons
 1982–1987: Sir John Thomson
 1987–1990: Sir Crispin Tickell
 1990–1995: Lord Hannay
 1995–1998: Sir John Weston
 1998–2003: Sir Jeremy Greenstock
 2003–2007: Sir Emyr Jones Parry
 2007–2009: Sir John Sawers
 2009–2015: Sir Mark Lyall Grant 
 2015–2018: Matthew Rycroft 

 2018–2020: Dame Karen Pierce
 2020–present: Dame Barbara Woodward

See also
United Kingdom and the United Nations

References

External links
UK Mission to the United Nations (New York)

United Nations
United Kingdom
 
United Kingdom and the United Nations